The men's light flyweight 49 kg boxing event at the 2015 European Games in Baku was held from 19 to 25 June at the Baku Crystal Hall.

Results

References

External links

Men 49